The Battle for Mosul Dam was a battle that took place in August 2014 between militants of the Islamic State of Iraq and the Levant (ISIL) and Kurdish Peshmerga forces, supported by Iraqi troops and U.S.-led Coalition airstrikes.

Background
Mosul Dam was captured by ISIL militants on August 7, 2014, after Kurdish forces retreated from the area, following a series of battles in the region. Some American officials described the fall of the dam as a grave concern, because it could release a  wave of water if it was destroyed, threatening towns and cities downstream. Following these recent developments, Kurdish forces, Iraqi forces, and the U.S. Air Force launched a counter-offensive to retake the dam.

Also of ongoing grave concern was/is the fact that Mosul Dam (formerly Saddam Dam) was constructed on evaporite rocks of the Miocene Fars (Fatha) Formation, which are water-soluble. As a result, the reservoir behind the dam was not filled to capacity. A continued regimen of pumping concrete grout into potential leaks meant that a long term interruption of remedial works could end in a reduction of structural integrity and disaster.

Events
On August 16, the U.S. Air Force launched air strikes on ISIL positions near the dam, destroying some of their equipment. Kurdish forces also launched attacks against ISIL on the same day, shelling their positions near the dam, and opening up the possibility for a ground attack. A Kurdish commander, Major General Abdelrahman Korini, told AFP that Peshmerga forces had captured the eastern side of the dam and were "still advancing." Rudaw, a Kurdish news organization, said the airstrikes appeared to be the "heaviest U.S. bombing of militant positions since the start of airstrikes" against ISIL last week. At least 11 ISIL fighters were killed by the airstrikes.

On August 17, the fighting continued. Kurdish officials said that peshmerga forces captured three towns near the dam: Tel Skuf, Sharafiya and Batnaya. The U.S.-led coalition had until that day conducted nine airstrikes and destroyed or damaged four armoured personnel carriers, seven armed vehicles, two Humvees and an armoured vehicle. ISIL militants tried to slow down Kurdish forces with explosive devices, including homemade bombs and land mines.

On August 18, Iraqi and Kurdish forces said that they had taken full control of the dam. US President Barack Obama also confirmed that the Mosul Dam was under complete Kurdish and Iraqi control. He also said that the move to recapture the Mosul Dam was a "major step forward" in the long-term strategy to defeat the militants. Journalists in the area reported that the fighting had not completely ended.

On August 19, the battle ended completely, with a Kurdish-Iraqi victory. BBC reporter Jim Muir, who has visited the dam, said it was "back in safe hands" and appeared intact.

See also
Tishrin Dam offensive
Battle of Mosul (2016–17)
Battle of Tabqa (2017)

References 

Conflicts in 2014
2014 in Iraqi Kurdistan
Battles involving the Islamic State of Iraq and the Levant in Iraqi Kurdistan
History of Mosul
Military operations of the Iraqi Civil War in 2014
Military operations of the War in Iraq (2013–2017) involving the United States
Military operations of the War in Iraq (2013–2017) involving the Islamic State of Iraq and the Levant
Military operations of the War in Iraq (2013–2017) involving the Peshmerga
August 2014 events in Iraq
Mosul_Dam